The 2005 NBA Development League Draft was the fifth annual draft by the NBA Development League. It was held on November 3, 2005.

Round 1
 1. Florida Flame: Andre Barrett
 2. Fayetteville Patriots: Nigel Dixon
 3. Fort Worth Flyers: Ime Udoka
 4. Arkansas Rimrockers: Harvey Thomas
 5. Roanoke Dazzle: Will Bynum
 6. Albuquerque Thunderbirds: Chuck Hayes
 7. Tulsa 66ers: Bernard King
 8. Austin Toros: Jamar Smith

Round 2
 1. Florida Flame: Ricky Shields
 2. Fayetteville Patriots: Erik Daniels
 3. Fort Worth Flyers: Luke Schenscher
 4. Arkansas Rimrockers: James Lang
 5. Roanoke Dazzle: Jeremy McNeil
 6. Albuquerque Thunderbirds: Marcus Taylor
 7. Tulsa 66ers: Mustafa Al-Sayaad
 8. Austin Toros: Ezra Williams

Round 3
 1. Florida Flame: Kyle Bailey
 2. Fayetteville Patriots: Norman Richardson
 3. Fort Worth Flyers: Vonteego Cummings
 4. Arkansas Rimrockers: Myron Allen
 5. Roanoke Dazzle: Andreas Glyniadakis
 6. Albuquerque Thunderbirds: Ken Johnson
 7. Tulsa 66ers: Desmon Farmer
 8. Austin Toros: Jeff Hagen

Round 4
 1. Florida Flame: Jonathan Moore
 2. Fayetteville Patriots: Robb Dryden
 3. Fort Worth Flyers: Ayudeji Akindele
 4. Arkansas Rimrockers: Adam Sonn
 5. Roanoke Dazzle: Anthony Grundy
 6. Albuquerque Thunderbirds: T. J. Cummings
 7. Tulsa 66ers: Otis George
 8. Austin Toros: Ryan Forehan-Kelly

Round 5
 1. Florida Flame: George Leach
 2. Fayetteville Patriots: Mark Karcher
 3. Fort Worth Flyers: Brandon Robinson
 4. Arkansas Rimrockers: Ed McCants
 5. Roanoke Dazzle: Nick Billings
 6. Albuquerque Thunderbirds: Cory Hightower
 7. Tulsa 66ers: Seamus Boxley
 8. Austin Toros: Neil Fingleton

Round 6
 1. Florida Flame: E.J. Rowland
 2. Fayetteville Patriots: Darnell Miller
 3. Fort Worth Flyers: Alejandro Carmona
 4. Arkansas Rimrockers: Chris Shumate
 5. Roanoke Dazzle: Nate Daniels
 6. Albuquerque Thunderbirds: Chet Mason
 7. Tulsa 66ers: Will Conroy
 8. Austin Toros: Marcus Moore

Round 7
 1. Florida Flame: Romel Beck
 2. Fayetteville Patriots: Roderick Riley
 3. Fort Worth Flyers: Daryl Dorsey
 4. Arkansas Rimrockers: Jamario Moon
 5. Roanoke Dazzle: Dan Miller
 6. Albuquerque Thunderbirds: Josh Moore
 7. Tulsa 66ers: Jerry Dupree
 8. Austin Toros: Ben Adams

Round 8
 1. Florida Flame: Anwar Ferguson
 2. Fayetteville Patriots: Anthony Coleman
 3. Fort Worth Flyers: Charles Hanks
 4. Arkansas Rimrockers: Brandon Freeman
 5. Roanoke Dazzle: Jermaine Bell
 6. Albuquerque Thunderbirds: Kevin Frey
 7. Tulsa 66ers: Cezary Trybanski
 8. Austin Toros: Ray Young

Round 9
 1. Florida Flame: Josh Gross
 2. Fayetteville Patriots: Steven Barber
 3. Fort Worth Flyers: Paul Pardue
 4. Arkansas Rimrockers: Jitim Young
 5. Roanoke Dazzle: Drew Woods
 6. Albuquerque Thunderbirds: Yuta Tabuse
 7. Tulsa 66ers: Paul Marigney
 8. Austin Toros: Corey Williams

Round 10
 1. Florida Flame: Torrian Jones
 2. Fayetteville Patriots: Carlos Hurt
 3. Fort Worth Flyers: Anthony Wilkins
 4. Arkansas Rimockers: Leonard Mosely
 5. Roanoke Dazzle: Malik Moore
 6. Albuquerque Thunderbirds: Greg Jefferson
 7. Tulsa 66ers: Rasheim Wright
 8. Austin Toros: Anthony Lever-Pedrosa

References

NBA G League draft
draft
National Basketball Development League draft